Homager och Pamfletter,(English: Homages and Pamphlets) is a music album recorded by the Swedish-Dutch folk 
singer-songwriter Cornelis Vreeswijk in 1981.

Track listing
"Pamflett Nr 8 "Ballad om en lergök"
"Blues för ett torn (Papperskvarnen)"
"Luchin"
"Hommage"
"Blues för Jacques Brel"
"Till Julia"
"Sambaliten"
"Pamflett 53"
"Pamflett 68: Vals för ingens hundar"
"Pamflett nr 62: Ta en moralkaka till"
"Hommage för Sveriges Radio"
"Pamflett 31: "Blues för Göteborg"

Personnel
 Cornelis Vreeswijk - vocal, guitar
 Conny Söderlund - guitar, vocal, rhythm instruments
 Owe Gustavsson - bass

Cornelis Vreeswijk albums
1981 albums